Sharmada Balu (born 9 August 1993) is a professional Indian tennis player.

Balu has career-high WTA rankings of 582 in singles, achieved on 30 November 2015, and 335 in doubles, reached on 3 August 2015. She has won two singles and 16 doubles titles at tournaments of the ITF Women's Circuit.

She won the gold medal for India in the doubles competition in partnership with Prarthana Thombare at the 12th South Asian Games held in Guwahati, India in February 2016.

She decided to quit tennis at the end of 2016 due to an injury and lack of financial support. Five years later she started playing tennis again. Balu made her WTA Tour main-draw debut at the 2022 Chennai Open in the doubles tournament, she is in partnership with her compatriot Riya Bhatia.

ITF finals

Singles: 2 (2 titles)

Doubles: 28 (16 titles, 12 runner-ups)

References

External links
 
 

1993 births
Living people
Indian female tennis players
Sportswomen from Karnataka
South Asian Games gold medalists for India
South Asian Games medalists in tennis